John Torkel Wallmark (4 June 1919 – 5 February 2007) was a Swedish electrical engineer and researcher in semiconductor electronics and innovation technology.

Torkel Wallmark was born in Stockholm. He graduated from the Royal Institute of Technology in 1944, became technology licentiate in 1947 and technology doctor in 1953. He was then a researcher at Radio Corporation of America in Princeton, US 1953–1964.

In 1964, he returned to Sweden as a professor in solid state electronics at Chalmers University of Technology. (The professorship was initially named electron physics III.) In 1983 he transferred to a personal professorship in innovation technology at Chalmers, which was the first in this subject area in Sweden. Torkel Wallmark's business in innovation technology has contributed to the establishment of seed companies based on research at Swedish technical colleges, especially Chalmers.

Torkel Wallmark was elected as a member of the Swedish Academy of Sciences in 1970 and became a member of the Academy of Sciences in 1984. He was awarded the 1982 Polhems Prize for research in the field of solid state electronics, 1989 KTH's grand prize for building an innovation center at Chalmers, and 1989 The Academy of Engineering Sciences major gold medal with the motivation "for his internationally outstanding efforts in semiconductor technology and his incentive for industrial new enterprise"''.

See also
CMOS

References

1919 births
2007 deaths
Engineers from Stockholm
Swedish electrical engineers
20th-century Swedish engineers
Academic staff of the Chalmers University of Technology
Place of death missing
KTH Royal Institute of Technology alumni
RCA people
Members of the Royal Swedish Academy of Sciences
[[Category:Fellows of the Institute of Electrical and Electronic Engineers]g